Pteropurpura erinaceoides is a species of sea snail, a marine gastropod mollusk in the family Muricidae, the murex snails or rock snails.

Description

Distribution

References

 Tuskes P. & Tuskes A. (2016). Native Pteropurpura of the eastern Pacific (Muricidae). The Festivus. 48(4): 211-220

External links
 Hinds, R. B. (1844). Descriptions of new species of Scalaria and Murex, from the collection of Sir Edward Belcher, C.B. Proceedings of the Zoological Society of London. (1843) 11: 124-129

Muricidae
Gastropods described in 1832